Georgian Supplement is a Unicode block containing characters for the ecclesiastical form of the Georgian script, Nuskhuri. To write the full ecclesiastical Khutsuri orthography, the Asomtavruli capitals encoded in the Georgian block.

Block

History
The following Unicode-related documents record the purpose and process of defining specific characters in the Georgian Supplement block:

References 

Unicode blocks